Walter Schoppitsch (born 10 December 1954) is a former Austrian footballer and manager. He last managed SK Austria Klagenfurt in 2011.

Personal

Schoppitsch is the father of professional footballer Kai Schoppitsch.

External links
 

1954 births
Living people
Austrian footballers
FC Kärnten players
Association football midfielders
SK Austria Klagenfurt managers
Austrian football managers